Torrens is a single-member electoral district for the South Australian House of Assembly. Located along the River Torrens, it is named after Sir Robert Richard Torrens, a 19th-century Premier of South Australia noted for being the founder of the "Torrens title" land registration system. Torrens is an  suburban electorate in Adelaide's north-east. It includes the suburbs of Gilles Plains, Greenacres, Hampstead Gardens, Hillcrest, Holden Hill, Klemzig, Manningham, Oakden, Vale Park, Valley View and Windsor Gardens.

Torrens has had three incarnations as a South Australian House of Assembly electoral district.

It was first created for the 1902 election as a five-seat multi-member district stretching from the north-eastern suburbs through the eastern and southern suburbs to the south-western suburbs; together with the three-member Port Adelaide (covering the north-western and western suburbs) and the four-member Adelaide (covering central Adelaide and the inner-northern suburbs), the three districts with a total of 12-members covered the whole of the metropolitan area in the 42 member house. Torrens was abolished and absorbed into the new seats of East Torrens and Sturt at the 1915 election.

Torrens existed as a marginal to fairly safe Liberal and Country League/Liberal single-member seat under the Playmander system from the 1938 election, lasting until the 1985 election, though it was won once by Labor at the 1944 election. Torrens was one of just three metropolitan seats (with Burnside and Mitcham) won by the Liberal and Country League in 1965 and 1968.

Torrens was recreated in its current state for the 1993 election, based on much of the abolished seats of Gilles and Todd, as a nominally marginal Labor seat, but was won for the Liberal Joe Tiernan. Tiernan died while in office in 1994, and Robyn Geraghty reclaimed the seat for Labor at the Torrens by-election with an 8.6 percent swing. Former Senator Dana Wortley won the seat for Labor at the 2014 election and has retained it through the 2018 election and subsequent 2022 election.

Members for Torrens

Election results

Notes

References
 ECSA profile for Torrens: 2018 
 ABC profile for Torrens: 2018
 Poll Bludger profile for Torrens: 2018

Electoral districts of South Australia
1902 establishments in Australia
1938 establishments in Australia
1993 establishments in Australia
1915 disestablishments in Australia
1985 disestablishments in Australia